The seventh series of the children's television series Hi-5 aired between 23 May 2005 and 22 July 2005 on the Nine Network in Australia. The season was produced by Kids Like Us for Nine with Helena Harris as executive producer.

Cast

Presenters
 Kellie Crawford – Word Play
 Kathleen de Leon Jones – Puzzles and Patterns
 Nathan Foley – Shapes in Space
 Tim Harding – Making Music
 Charli Robinson  – Body Move

Episodes

Home video releases

Awards and nominations

Notes

References

External links
 Hi-5 Website

2005 Australian television seasons